A media lock-up is a security procedure typically associated with politically sensitive disclosures and press conferences. During a media lock-up, accredited journalists receive advance access to information and expert advisers in order to assist with the accuracy of their reporting on matters disclosed. A media lock-up ends when a timed embargo on the release of information is lifted.

Process 
Journalists may be required to sign deed polls or other agreements prior to receiving permission to attend media lock-ups. Mobile phones may be required to be turned off and/or left with a security supervisor upon entry. Laptop, wireless and mobile phone devices must generally be disconnected to prevent any other means of outbound communication until a scheduled embargo is lifted. During a media lock-up, attendees are not permitted to leave the room, and no-one is allowed to approach any internal communications infrastructure. In cases where mobile phones are not required to be surrendered, attendees may be subject to escorts when visiting the bathroom.

Use 
Institutions to impose media lock-ups include the Reserve Bank of Australia, the Australian Government, the New Zealand Treasury, the United States Department of Labor, the South African Treasury, the Government of Canada and the Supreme Court of Canada. The Supreme Court of Canada has stated that it uses media lock-ups "to improve the accuracy of media reporting of Supreme Court of Canada decisions and to assist members of the media in reporting on cases that have attracted a high level of public interest."

Response 
Lock-ups associated with the Australian budget have been controversial. In 2014, members of several trade unions claimed that they have been refused entry to a stakeholder lock-up. Some journalists consider the Australian budget media lock-up "pointless", noting that contentious matters are typically already known due to prior leaks to the press. In 2013, one unnamed attendee described the budget lock-up as "one way the Government can sell its message... They have a captive audience, quite literally."

A media lock-up held by the Government of Canada in January 2015 prior to the tabling of an anti-terrorism bill was criticized by attendees, who were denied access to the bill ahead of the press conference.

In 2011 author Nicholas Russell wrote that media lock-ups "may do more good than harm" by providing journalists with "thinking time" on complex matters. He also wrote that "It can be argued that the lock-up system leads to wholesale homogenization of the news - everyone gets basically the same story."

References 

Journalism